E-san Thai Cuisine is a Thai restaurant with multiple locations in the Portland metropolitan area, in the United States.

History and locations
There was a stationary food cart in Vancouver, Washington, as of 2015. The Vancouver had 36 food options with beef, chicken, pork, or tofu. The menu included Pad See Ew, Gang Garee, and Pad Kee Mao. The food pod in Happy Valley, Oregon was slated to have an E-san cart, as of 2015.

There was also a food cart at the Tidbit Food Farm and Garden food pod at the intersection of Southeast 28th Avenue and Division Street. The pod opened in 2014 closed in 2017. BG's Food Cartel at The Round, a food pod in Beaverton, Oregon, had two E-San carts, as of 2018.

The restaurant in downtown Portland's Haseltine Building closed in January 2021, during the COVID-19 pandemic. The restaurant's January 9 announcement read, "We want to thank our past crew members and especially our loyal customers for supporting E-San in our 22 years of being open. We are devastated to see it go, but also extremely grateful for the connections and experiences it has brought us as a family business."

Reception
In 2016 and 2017, E-san was a runner-up in the Best Pad Thai category in Willamette Week annual readers' poll.

References

External links

 

Asian restaurants in Portland, Oregon
Food carts in Portland, Oregon
Thai restaurants in the United States
Thai-American culture in Oregon
Thai-American culture in Washington (state)